Ghandoura Subdistrict  is a subdistrict of Jarabulus District in northern Aleppo Governorate, northwestern Syria. The administrative centre is the town of Ghandoura.

At the 2004 census, the subdistrict had a population of 17,314.

Towns and villages

References 

Jarabulus District
Ghandoura